Mavelipalaiyam railway station is a station in Tamil Nadu, India, located between  and .

References

Salem railway division
Railway stations in Salem district